Something's Coming! is an album by vibraphonist Gary Burton recorded in 1963 and released on the RCA label in 1964. This album features Burton playing with guitarist Jim Hall, bassist Chuck Israels and drummer Larry Bunker, three musicians associated with pianist Bill Evans.

Reception 
The Allmusic review by Scott Yanow stated: "Gary Burton's third full-length album as a leader finds him rapidly developing into a fresh new voice on the vibes".

Track listing
 "On Green Dolphin Street" (Bronisław Kaper, Ned Washington) - 4:04   
 "Melanie" (Michael Gibbs) -  3:51   
 "Careful" (Jim Hall) - 4:07   
 "Six Improvisatory Sketches" (Michael Gibbs) - 5:04   
 "Something's Coming" (Leonard Bernstein, Stephen Sondheim) - 6:10   
 "Little Girl Blue" (Richard Rodgers, Lorenz Hart) - 7:05   
 "Summertime" (DuBose Heyward, George Gershwin) - 4:54  
Recorded at RCA Victor's Studio B in New York City on August 14–16, 1963.

Personnel 
 Gary Burton — vibraphone
Jim Hall — guitar 
Chuck Israels — bass  
Larry Bunker — drums

References 

RCA Records albums
Gary Burton albums
1964 albums
Albums produced by George Avakian